Laal Ishq is a 2016 Indian Marathi language romance mystery thriller film, directed by Swapna Waghmare Joshi and produced by  Sanjay Leela Bhansali and co-produced by Shabina Khan under the Bhansali Productions banner. The film is scheduled for release on 27 May 2016.

Swwapnil Joshi will be in male, Anjana Sukhani and Sneha Chavan  will be in female lead roles respectively. The movie will be debut for Anjana Sukhani in Marathi films.

Cast
 Swwapnil Joshi as Yash Patwardhan
 Anjana Sukhani as Jahnvi
 Sneha Chavan as Shreya
 Samidha Guru as Inspector Ms Nimbalkar
 Kamlesh Sawant as Inspector Kale
 Milind Gawali
 Jayant Wadkar as Poddar
 Priya Berde
 Piyush Ranade as Vinay
 Yashashri Masurkar as Nisha
 Uday Nene

Plot
Laal Ishq is a love story entwined with a murder that takes place in a resort, and the prime suspects for the murder are the two leads of the film.

Music
The Chand Matla Song is composed by Nilesh Moharir and Chimani Chimani and composed by Amitraj. The music rights are acquired by Video Palace.

Box office
Laal Ishq opened to good response in Maharashtra. It collected  ,  and   nett, with the total of   nett and   gross at the box office. The movie net collection  in 5 days.

References

2010s Marathi-language films
2016 films
2010s mystery thriller films
2010s romantic thriller films
Indian mystery thriller films
Indian romantic thriller films
Films directed by Swapna Waghmare Joshi